"When Love Comes Around the Bend" is a song recorded by American country music artist Juice Newton.  It was released in May 1989 as a promotional single from the album Ain't Gonna Cry.  The song reached #40 on the Billboard Hot Country Single & Tracks chart.  The song was written by Pam Tillis, Josh Leo and Mark Wright. 

Dan Seals also recorded it on his 1992 album Walking the Wire. His version was a single as well, peaking at number 52 on the same chart.

Chart performance

Juice Newton

Dan Seals

References

1989 singles
1989 songs
1992 singles
Dan Seals songs
Juice Newton songs
Songs written by Josh Leo
Songs written by Pam Tillis
Songs written by Mark Wright (record producer)
Song recordings produced by Josh Leo
Song recordings produced by Kyle Lehning
RCA Records singles
Warner Records singles